Reedham is a village and civil parish in the English county of Norfolk and within The Broads.

The villages name means 'Reedy homestead/village' or 'reedy hemmed-in land'.

Before the draining of the marshes towards Great Yarmouth, Reedham was a coastal village which included a Roman lighthouse. Fragments of Roman brick and stone can be found in the local church.

King Edmund of East Anglia is said to have lived here. The Fastolf family, whose most celebrated member was Sir John Fastolf, are recorded here from the 13th century.

The civil parish includes a significant area of nearby marshland, together with the famously isolated settlement of Berney Arms. For the purposes of local government, the parish falls within the district of Broadland.

Reedham Ferry, a chain ferry just outside the village, is the only road crossing point on the River Yare between Norwich and Great Yarmouth. The railway line between Norwich and Lowestoft crosses the river on Reedham Swing Bridge. Reedham railway station, which serves the village, gives connections to Norwich, Lowestoft, and Great Yarmouth (via Berney Arms).

Polkey's Mill is a derelict grade II* listed windpump dating from about 1880.

See also
  was a

Notes 

http://kepn.nottingham.ac.uk/map/place/Norfolk/Reedham

External links

 
 Information from Genuki Norfolk on Reedham.

Villages in Norfolk
Broadland
Civil parishes in Norfolk